QSC may refer to:

Corporations
QSC AG, a German telecommunications and DSL provider
QSC Audio Products, a global amplifier and loudspeaker manufacturer based in California
Queens Surface Corporation, a former bus company in New York City

Colleges
Queen's School of Computing, a department of Queen's University in Kingston, Ontario, Canada
Quirino State College, former name of Quirino State University in Quirino, Philippines

Other uses
QSC, the IATA airport code for São Carlos Airport in Brazil
QSC, a radiotelegraphic Q code meaning "are you a cargo vessel" when posed as a question
qSc, a portion of the equation defining the pitching moment coefficient of an airfoil
Quebec Superior Court, the trial-level superior court of the province of Quebec, Canada
Queens Sports Club, a stadium in Bulawayo, Zimbabwe
QSC&V (Quality, Service, Cleanliness & Value), a quality benchmark used by McDonald's Corporation
QSC supercomputer (2004–2007), a supercomputer at Los Alamos National Laboratory which replaced Blue Mountain (supercomputer)